This is a list of defunct airlines of Iran.

See also
 List of airlines of Iran
 List of airports in Iran

References

Iran
Airlines
Airlines, defunct